This is a list of wars involving the Oriental Republic of Uruguay from 1825 to the present.

References

Bibliography
 

 
Uruguay
Wars